Saeed Al-Issa is a Saudi Arabian football player who currently plays as a left-back for Al-Sadd.

External links
slstat.com Profile

1988 births
Living people
Saudi Arabian footballers
Al-Shabab FC (Riyadh) players
Al-Raed FC players
Al-Shoulla FC players
Sdoos Club players
Al-Diriyah Club players
Al-Sadd FC (Saudi football club) players
Saudi Second Division players
Saudi First Division League players
Saudi Professional League players
Association football fullbacks